This is a list of members of the 4th Bundestag – the lower house of parliament of the Federal Republic of Germany, whose members were in office from 1961 until 1965.



Summary 
This summary includes changes in the numbers of the three caucuses (CDU/CSU, SPD, FDP):

Members

A 
 Ernst Achenbach, FDP
 Annemarie Ackermann, CDU (from 16 January 1965)
 Konrad Adenauer, CDU
 Eduard Adorno, CDU
 Heinrich Aigner, CSU
 Luise Albertz, SPD
 Walter Althammer, CSU
 Jakob Altmaier, SPD (until 8 February 1963)
 Artur Anders, SPD (from 17 April 1963)
 Walter Arendt, SPD
 Josef Arndgen, CDU
 Adolf Arndt, SPD
 Gottfried Arnold, CDU
 Helmut Artzinger, CDU
 Albrecht Aschoff, FDP
 Karl Atzenroth, FDP
 Heinrich Auge, SPD

B 
 Fritz Baade, SPD
 Harri Bading, SPD
 Fritz Baier, CDU
 Albert Baldauf, CDU
 Siegfried Balke, CSU
 Bernhard Balkenhol, CDU
 Hans Bals, SPD
 Willy Bartsch, SPD (from 23 October 1963)
 Rainer Barzel, CDU
 Hannsheinz Bauer, SPD
 Josef Bauer, CSU
 Willi Bäuerle, SPD (from 31 May 1963)
 Bernhard Bauknecht, CDU
 Rudolf Bäumer, SPD
 Paul Bausch, CDU
 Helmut Bazille, SPD
 Karl Bechert, SPD
 Curt Becker, CDU (from 11 June 1964)
 Josef Becker, CDU
 Walter Behrendt, SPD
 Ernst Benda, CDU
 August Berberich, CDU
 Urich Berger, CDU (from 22 December 1964)
 Margarete Berger-Heise, SPD
 Karl Bergmann, SPD
 Karl Wilhelm Berkhan, SPD
 August Berlin, SPD
 Anton Besold, CSU
 Willi Beuster, SPD
 Karl Bewerunge, CDU
 Lucie Beyer, SPD
 Hermann Biechele, CDU
 Curt Biegler, SPD
 Adolf Bieringer, CDU
 Günter Biermann, SPD
 Willi Birkelbach, SPD (until 30 September 1964)
 Kurt Birrenbach, CDU
 Otto Christian Archibald von Bismarck, CDU
 Peter Blachstein, SPD
 Theodor Blank, CDU
 Paul Bleiß, SPD
 Hildegard Bleyler, CDU
 Hans Blöcker, CDU
 Irma Blohm, CDU
 Erik Blumenfeld, CDU
 Ernst von Bodelschwingh, CDU
 Franz Böhm, CDU
 Georg Böhme, CDU
 Holger Börner, SPD
 Peter Wilhelm Brand, CDU
 Willy Brandt, SPD (until 27 December 1961)
 Max Brauer, SPD
 Aenne Brauksiepe, CDU
 Josef Braun, SPD
 Julyus Brecht, SPD (until 10 July 1962)
 Heinz Brenck, CSU
 Heinrich von Brentano, CDU (until 14 November 1964)
 Wilhelm Brese, CDU
 Valentin Brück, CDU
 Eberhard Brünen, SPD
 August Bruse, SPD (from 16 July 1962)
 Gerd Bucerius, CDU (until 22 March 1962)
 Ewald Bucher, FDP
 Werner Buchstaller, SPD
 Karl August Bühler, CDU
 Richard Burckardt, FDP
 Fritz Burgbacher, CDU
 Alfred Burgemeister, CDU
 Arthur Busch, SPD (from 26 January 1962)
 Hermann Busse, FDP
 Fritz Büttner, SPD

C 
 Hermann Conring, CDU
 Fritz Corterier, SPD
 Johann Cramer, SPD
 Herbert Czaja, CDU

D 
 Rolf Dahlgrün, FDP
 Werner Danz, FDP
 Thomas Dehler, FDP
 Heinrich Deist, SPD (until 7 March 1964)
 Rembert van Delden, CDU
 Volrad Deneke, FDP (from 26 July 1963)
 Arved Deringer, CDU
 Hans Dichgans, CDU
 Hermann Diebäcker, CDU
 Bruno Diekmann, SPD
 Emmy Diemer-Nicolaus, FDP
 Stefan Dittrich, CSU
 Clara Döhring, SPD
 Werner Dollinger, CSU
 Wilhelm Dopatka, SPD
 Wolfgang Döring, FDP (until 17 January 1963)
 Wolfram Dörinkel, FDP
 Wolfram Dorn, FDP
 Hans Drachsler, CSU
 Heinrich Draeger, CDU
 August Dresbach, CDU
 Wilhelm Dröscher, SPD
 Hermann Dürr, FDP

E 
 Walter Eckhardt, CSU (from 21 July 1964)
 Josef Effertz, FDP
 Georg Ehnes, CSU
 Hermann Ehren, CDU (from 4 October 1962 until 30 November 1964)
 Ernst Theodor Eichelbaum, CDU
 Elfriede Eilers, SPD
 Otto Eisenmann, FDP
 Alexander Elbrächter, CDU
 Ilse Elsner, SPD
 Hans Georg Emde, FDP
 Ernst Engelbrecht-Greve, CDU (until 7 December 1962)
 Margarete Engländer, CDU (from 1 August 1962)
 Erhard Eppler, SPD
 Ludwig Erhard, CDU
 Fritz Erler, SPD
 Josef Ertl, FDP
 Fritz Eschmann, SPD
 Franz Etzel, CDU
 Johannes Even, CDU (until 24 November 1964)
 Bert Even, CDU
 Karl-Heinz Exner, CDU (from 30 November 1964)

F 
 Franz Falke, CDU
 Walter Faller, SPD
 Josef Felder, SPD
 Werner Figgen, SPD
 Hermann Finckh, CDU (until 28 April 1962)
 Gerhard Flämig, SPD (from 15 February 1963)
 Hedi Flitz, FDP
 Erwin Folger, SPD
 Egon Franke, SPD
 Ludwig Franz, CSU
 Jakob Franzen, CDU (until 8 October 1965)
 Günter Frede, SPD
 Heinz Frehsee, SPD
 Martin Frey, CDU
 Brigitte Freyh, SPD (from 22 December 1961)
 Ferdinand Friedensburg, CDU
 Walter Fritsch, SPD
 Gerhard Fritz, CDU (until 5 January 1965)
 Liselotte Funcke, FDP
 Friedrich Funk, CSU (until 5 August 1963)
 Hans Furler, CDU

G 
 Walter Gaßmann, CDU
 Gustav-Adolf Gedat, CDU
 Albrecht Gehring, CDU
 Helmut Geiger, CSU (from 8 June 1965)
 Hans Geiger, SPD
 Ingeborg Geisendörfer, CSU
 Horst Gerlach, SPD
 Walter Richard Gerlich, CDU (from 24 August 1963)
 Heinrich Gerns, CDU (until 20 August 1963)
 Eugen Gerstenmaier, CDU
 Heinrich Gewandt, CDU
 Paul Gibbert, CDU
 Christian Giencke, CDU
 Franz Gleissner, CSU
 Eugen Glombig, SPD (from 25 January 1962)
 Hermann Glüsing, CDU
 Wilhelm Goldhagen, CDU (until 7 January 1964)
 Wilhelm Gontrum, Other
 Karl Gossel, CDU
 Leo Gottesleben, CDU
 Hermann Götz, CDU
 Johann Baptist Gradl, CDU
 Annemarie Griesinger, CDU (from 23 November 1964)
 Kurt Gscheidle, SPD
 Max Güde, CDU
 Bernhard Günther, CDU
 Karl Theodor Freiherr von und zu Guttenberg, CSU

H 
 Hermann Haage, SPD
 Centa Haas, CSU (from 9 August 1963)
 Detlef Haase, SPD (from 10 November 1961)
 Lothar Haase, CDU
 Marlis Gräfin vom Hagen, CDU (from 20 January 1964)
 Wilhelm Hahn, CDU (from 9 May 1962 until 16 November 1964)
 Karl Hahn, CDU
 Heinrich Hamacher, SPD
 Ludwig Hamm, FDP
 Walter Hammersen, FDP
 Fritz von Haniel-Niethammer, CSU
 Hermann Hansing, SPD
 Walter Harm, SPD (until 10 August 1964)
 Johann Harnischfeger, CDU
 Kurt Härzschel, CDU (from 28 October 1963)
 Herbert Hauffe, SPD
 Hugo Hauser, CDU
 Erwin Häussler, CDU (from 20 April 1964)
 Bruno Heck, CDU
 Johann Karl Heide, SPD
 Rudolf-Ernst Heiland, SPD (until 6 May 1965)
 Gustav Heinemann, SPD
 Martin Heix, CDU
 Josef Hellenbrock, SPD
 Walther Hellige, FDP
 Hermann Herberts, SPD (from 12 March 1964)
 Luise Herklotz, SPD
 Hans Hermsdorf, SPD
 Karl Herold, SPD
 Carl Hesberg, CDU
 Clemens Hesemann, CDU
 Hedda Heuser, FDP (from 6 December 1962)
 Anton Hilbert, CDU
 Martin Hirsch, SPD
 Hermann Höcherl, CSU
 Josef Höchst, CDU
 Wilhelm Hoegner, SPD (until 4 January 1962)
 Heinrich Höfler, CDU (until 21 October 1963)
 Egon Höhmann, SPD
 Franz Höhne, SPD
 Heinrich Holkenbrink, CDU
 Matthias Hoogen, CDU (until 11 December 1964)
 Fritz Wilhelm Hörauf, SPD
 Hans Hörmann, SPD
 Peter Horn, CDU
 Heinrich Hörnemann, CDU
 Alex Hösl, CSU
 Viktor Hoven, FDP
 Elinor Hubert, SPD
 Klaus Hübner, SPD (from 13 May 1965)
 Karl Hübner, CDU
 Josef Hufnagel, SPD
 Rudolf Hussong, SPD
 Eugen Huthmacher, CDU (until 13 February 1962)
 Lambert Huys, CDU

I 
 Joseph Illerhaus, CDU
 Wolfgang Imle, FDP
 Hans Iven, SPD

J 
 Maria Jacobi, CDU
 Werner Jacobi, SPD
 Peter Jacobs, SPD
 Richard Jaeger, CSU
 Gerhard Jahn, SPD
 Wenzel Jaksch, SPD
 Johann Peter Josten, CDU
 Hans-Jürgen Junghans, SPD
 Gerhard Jungmann, CDU
 Heinrich Junker, SPD
 Nikolaus Jürgensen, SPD

K 
 Rudolf Kaffka, SPD
 Georg Kahn-Ackermann, SPD (from 10 January 1962)
 Hellmut Kalbitzer, SPD
 Margot Kalinke, CDU
 Karl Kanka, CDU
 Hans Katzer, CDU
 Irma Keilhack, SPD (until 19 January 1962)
 Ernst Keller, FDP (until 21 July 1963)
 Emil Kemmer, CSU (until 7 October 1964)
 Friedrich Kempfler, CSU
 Alma Kettig, SPD
 Emilie Kiep-Altenloh, FDP
 Arthur Killat, SPD
 Liesel Kipp-Kaule, SPD
 Marie-Elisabeth Klee, CDU
 Günter Klein, SPD (until 22 October 1963)
 Johann Klein, CDU
 Ingeborg Kleinert, SPD (from 13 November 1964)
 Georg Kliesing, CDU
 Hans-Jürgen Klinker, CDU (from 10 December 1962)
 Ludwig Knobloch, CDU
 Friedrich Knorr, CSU
 Gerhard Koch, SPD
 Jakob Koenen, SPD
 Richard Kohlberger, SPD
 Oswald Adolph Kohut, FDP
 Willy Könen, SPD
 Hermann Kopf, CDU
 Lisa Korspeter, SPD
 Edith Krappe, SPD
 Friedrich Kraus, SPD
 Reinhold Kreitmeyer, FDP
 Gerhard Kreyssig, SPD
 Herbert Kriedemann, SPD
 Heinrich Krone, CDU
 Georg Krug, CSU
 Hans Krüger, CDU
 Ewald Krümmer, FDP (from 24 January 1963)
 Werner Kubitza, FDP
 Paul Kübler, SPD
 Edeltraud Kuchtner, CSU
 Knut von Kühlmann-Stumm, FDP
 Walther Kühn, FDP (until 4 December 1962)
 Heinz Kühn, SPD (until 9 April 1963)
 Friedrich Kühn, CDU
 Alwin Kulawig, SPD
 Ernst Kuntscher, CDU
 Georg Kurlbaum, SPD
 Josef Kurtz, CDU (from 12 October 1964)

L 
 Georg Lang, CSU (until 1 June 1965)
 Erwin Lange, SPD
 Walter Langebeck, SPD
 Hans Lautenschlager, SPD
 Georg Leber, SPD
 Albert Leicht, CDU
 Ernst Lemmer, CDU
 Karl Heinz Lemmrich, CSU
 Hubert Lemper, SPD
 Aloys Lenz, CDU
 Hans Lenz, FDP
 Werner Lenz, SPD
 Franz Lenze, CDU
 Gottfried Leonhard, CDU
 Josef Lermer, CSU (until 15 July 1964)
 Edmund Leukert, CSU (from 27 June 1962)
 Harry Liehr, SPD (from 11 January 1962)
 Karl Löbe, FDP
 Fritz Logemann, FDP
 Ulrich Lohmar, SPD
 Walter Löhr, CDU
 Dora Lösche, SPD (from 18 April 1963)
 Johannes Lücke, SPD
 Paul Lücke, CDU
 Hans August Lücker, CSU
 Manfred Luda, CDU
 Adolf Ludwig, SPD (from 6 January 1962 until 18 February 1962)
 Karl-Heinz Lünenstraß, SPD (until 16 May 1963)

M 
 Ernst Majonica, CDU
 Konrad Mälzig, FDP
 Georg Baron Manteuffel-Szoege, CSU (until 8 June 1962)
 Robert Margulies, FDP (until 27 August 1964)
 Werner Marquardt, SPD
 Berthold Martin, CDU
 Franz Marx, SPD
 Hans Matthöfer, SPD
 Kurt Mattick, SPD
 Oskar Matzner, SPD
 Eugen Maucher, CDU
 Adolf Mauk, FDP
 Agnes Katharina Maxsein, CDU
 Wilhelm Maybaum, SPD (from 22 May 1963)
 Josef Mayer, CDU
 Hedwig Meermann, SPD
 Hans Meis, CDU
 Linus Memmel, CSU
 Erich Mende, FDP
 Theodor Mengelkamp, CDU
 Josef Menke, CDU
 Alexander Menne, FDP
 Walter Menzel, SPD (until 24 September 1963)
 Hans-Joachim von Merkatz, CDU
 Hans Merten, SPD
 Werner Mertes, FDP
 Rudolf Metter, SPD
 Ludwig Metzger, SPD
 Philipp Meyer, CSU (until 29 January 1962)
 Ernst Wilhelm Meyer, SPD
 Erich Meyer, SPD
 Wilhelm Michels, SPD
 Josef Mick, CDU
 Herwart Miessner, FDP
 Wolfgang Mischnick, FDP
 Artur Missbach, CDU
 Karl Moersch, FDP (from 1 September 1964)
 Alex Möller, SPD
 Karl Mommer, SPD
 Heinz Morgenstern, SPD
 Klaus Freiherr von Mühlen, FDP
 Adolf Müller, CDU
 Hans Müller, SPD
 Heinrich Müller, SPD
 Johannes Müller, CDU
 Josef Müller, CDU
 Karl Müller, SPD
 Willy Müller, SPD
 Adolf Müller-Emmert, SPD
 Ernst Müller-Hermann, CDU
 Leonhard Murr, FDP
 Franzjosef Müser, CDU

N 
 Peter Nellen, SPD
 Kurt Neubauer, SPD (until 16 April 1963)
 Erich Peter Neumann, CDU
 Franz Neumann, SPD
 Wilhelm Nieberg, CDU
 Alois Niederalt, CSU
 Uwe-Jens Nissen, SPD (until 1 October 1964)

O 
 Theodor Oberländer, CDU (from 9 May 1963)
 Richard Oetzel, CDU
 Wilhelm Ohlemeyer, SPD (from 14 June 1965)
 Erich Ollenhauer, SPD (until 14 December 1963)
 Alfred Ollesch, FDP
 Rudolf Opitz, FDP

P 
 Maria Pannhoff, CDU
 Ernst Paul, SPD
 Willi Peiter, SPD (from 22 February 1962)
 Georg Peters, SPD
 Walter Peters, FDP
 Robert Pferdmenges, CDU (until 28 September 1962)
 Walter Pflaumbaum, CDU
 Gerhard Philipp, CDU
 Elisabeth Pitz-Savelsberg, CDU
 Arnold Poepke, CDU
 Kurt Pohle, SPD (until 3 November 1961)
 Hans-Jürgen Pohlenz, SPD (from 30 September 1963 until 10 June 1965)
 Heinz Pöhler, SPD
 Josef Porten, CDU
 Konrad Porzner, SPD (from 21 May 1962)
 Ludwig Preiß, CDU (from 24 November 1964)
 Moritz-Ernst Priebe, SPD
 Maria Probst, CSU

R 
 Willy Max Rademacher, FDP
 August Ramminger, CSU
 Egon Wilhelm Ramms, FDP
 Will Rasner, CDU
 Hans Rauhaus, CDU
 Karl Ravens, SPD
 Karl Regling, SPD
 Luise Rehling, CDU (until 29 May 1964)
 Reinhold Rehs, SPD
 Gerhard Reichhardt, SPD (from 5 October 1964)
 Martin Reichmann, FDP
 Carl Reinhard, CDU
 Gerhard Reischl, SPD
 Wilhelm Reitz, SPD
 Richard Reitzner, SPD (until 11 May 1962)
 Annemarie Renger, SPD
 Hans Richarts, CDU
 Clemens Riedel, CDU
 Karl Riegel, SPD
 Walter Rieger, FDP
 Fritz Rinderspacher, SPD
 Heinrich Georg Ritzel, SPD
 Carl Roesch, SPD
 Helmut Rohde, SPD
 Dietrich Rollmann, CDU
 Josef Rommerskirchen, CDU
 Josef Rösing, CDU (from 30 June 1965)
 Kurt Ross, SPD (from 18 August 1964)
 Margarete Rudoll, SPD
 Thomas Ruf, CDU
 Franz Ruland, CDU (from 19 February 1962 until 28 September 1964)
 Wolfgang Rutschke, FDP

S 
 Heinrich Sander, FDP
 Fritz Sänger, SPD
 Karl-Heinz Saxowski, SPD
 Friedrich Schäfer, SPD
 Marta Schanzenbach, SPD
 Walter Scheel, FDP
 Ernst Schellenberg, SPD
 Heinrich Scheppmann, CDU
 Josef Scheuren, SPD
 Albrecht Schlee, CSU (from 15 February 1963)
 Josef Schlick, CDU
 Helmut Schlüter, SPD (from 11 September 1964)
 Carlo Schmid, SPD
 Helmut Schmidt, SPD (until 19 January 1962)
 Hansheinrich Schmidt, FDP
 Hermann Schmidt, SPD
 Horst Schmidt, SPD
 Martin Schmidt, SPD
 Otto Schmidt, CDU
 Walter Schmidt, SPD
 Hermann Schmitt-Vockenhausen, SPD
 Kurt Schmücker, CDU
 , CDU (from 27 March 1962)
 Heinrich Schneider, FDP
 Erwin Schoettle, SPD
 Kurt Schröder, SPD (until 6 September 1964)
 Gerhard Schröder, CDU
 Christa Schroeder, CDU
 Georg Schulhoff, CDU
 Fritz-Rudolf Schultz, FDP
 Klaus Schütz, SPD (until 9 January 1962)
 Hans Schütz, CSU (until 5 February 1963)
 Wolfgang Schwabe, SPD
 Werner Schwarz, CDU
 Elisabeth Schwarzhaupt, CDU
 Hermann Schwörer, CDU
 Hans-Christoph Seebohm, CDU
 Roland Seffrin, CDU
 Philipp Seibert, SPD
 Max Seidel, SPD
 Franz Seidl, CSU
 Hans Stefan Seifriz, SPD
 Max Seither, SPD
 Elfriede Seppi, SPD
 Günther Serres, CDU
 Walter Seuffert, SPD
 Franz Seume, SPD
 J Hermann Siemer, CDU
 Edmund Sinn, CDU
 Friedrich Soetebier, FDP
 Josef Spies, CSU
 Kurt Spitzmüller, FDP
 Wolfgang Stammberger, SPD
 Heinz Starke, FDP
 Robert Stauch, CDU
 Josef Stecker, CDU
 Gustav Stein, CDU
 Fritz Steinhoff, SPD
 Willy Steinmetz, CDU
 Heinrich Stephan, SPD
 Georg Stiller, CSU
 Josef Stingl, CDU
 Gerhard Stoltenberg, CDU
 Maria Stommel, CDU (from 4 December 1964)
 Heinrich Stooß, CDU
 Anton Storch, CDU
 Friedrich-Karl Storm, CDU
 Franz Josef Strauß, CSU
 Otto Striebeck, SPD
 Käte Strobel, SPD
 Alois Strohmayr, SPD
 Detlef Struve, CDU
 Richard Stücklen, CSU
 Gustav Sühler, CSU
 Ernst Supf, FDP
 Adolf Süsterhenn, CDU

T 
 Richard Tamblé, SPD
 Theodor Teriete, CDU
 Hanns Theis, SPD
 Peter Tobaben, CDU
 Hans Toussaint, CDU

U 
 Franz Xaver Unertl, CSU
 Wilhelm Urban, SPD

V 
 Franz Varelmann, CDU
 Arnold Verhoeven, CDU
 Elisabeth Vietje, CDU (until 2 May 1963)
 Felix von Vittinghoff-Schell, CDU
 Rudolf Vogel, CDU (until 15 April 1964)
 Karl-Heinz Vogt, CSU

W 
 Gerhard Wacher, CSU (until 26 March 1963)
 Gerold Wächter, FDP
 Friedrich Wilhelm Wagner, SPD (until 19 December 1961)
 Leo Wagner, CSU
 Eduard Wahl, CDU
 Fritz Walter, FDP
 Helene Weber, CDU (until 25 July 1962)
 Fritz Weber, FDP
 Karl Weber, CDU
 Heinz Wegener, SPD
 Heinrich Wehking, CDU
 Herbert Wehner, SPD
 Franz Weigl, CSU
 Otto Weinkamm, CSU
 Paul Weinzierl, CSU
 Erwin Welke, SPD
 Hans Wellmann, SPD (from 1 January 1962)
 Heinrich Welslau, SPD
 Emmi Welter, CDU
 Ernst Weltner, SPD
 Helmut Wendelborn, CDU
 Rudolf Werner, CDU
 Helene Wessel, SPD
 Karl Wienand, SPD
 Karl Wieninger, CSU
 Werner Wilhelm, SPD
 Hans Wilhelmi, CDU
 Friedrich Wilhelm Willeke, CDU (until 24 June 1965)
 Heinrich Windelen, CDU
 Bernhard Winkelheide, CDU
 Friedrich Winter, CSU (from 2 February 1962)
 Ladislaus Winterstein, SPD (from 26 October 1964 until 2 November 1964)
 Hans-Jürgen Wischnewski, SPD
 Franz Wittmann, CSU (from 26 October 1964)
 Kurt Wittmer-Eigenbrodt, CDU
 Karl Wittrock, SPD (until 8 May 1963)
 Willi Wolf, SPD (from 19 December 1963)
 Franz-Josef Wuermeling, CDU
 Heinrich Wullenhaupt, CDU

Z 
 Erich Ziegler, CSU (from 1 April 1963)
 Alois Zimmer, CDU
 Else Zimmermann, SPD
 Friedrich Zimmermann, CSU
 Georg-August Zinn, SPD (until 13 December 1961)
 Siegfried Zoglmann, FDP
 Ernst Zühlke, SPD

See also 
 Politics of Germany
 List of Bundestag Members

04